is a volcanic island in the Sea of Japan, 2.5 km from the coast of the Kyoto Prefecture in Japan. Kutsujima Island is administered as part of Maizuru city. Currently, the islets are designated as the Kanmurijima-Kutsujima Wildlife Protection Area, and any landing is prohibited.

History
According to inscriptions on Tango no kuni fudoki, the Kanmurijima and Kutsujima are the remains of the much larger island which submerged following an earthquake in 701 A.D. The topography of seafloor seems to support the claim, as the steep 60-meters cliff is located underwater off eastern coast of Kanmurijima and Kutsujuma, indicating a recent crustal fault. The northern islet is inaccessible without rock-climbing equipment, and was the famous hermits prayer location during the late 19th century.

See also

 This article incorporates material from Japanese Wikipedia page 沓島, accessed 5 January 2017
 Kanmurijima
 Desert island
 List of islands

References

Islands of Kyoto Prefecture
Islands of the Sea of Japan
Uninhabited islands of Japan
Important Bird Areas of Japan
Seabird colonies